Johann Matthias Hungerbühler (2 September 1805, in Wittenbach – 14 July 1884) was a Swiss politician and President of the Swiss National Council (1852/1853).

Further reading

External links 
 
 

1805 births
1884 deaths
People from the canton of St. Gallen
Swiss Roman Catholics
Members of the National Council (Switzerland)
Presidents of the National Council (Switzerland)